The Ministry of Truth: The Biography of George Orwell's 1984 is a book-length history of George Orwell's 1949 dystopian novel Nineteen Eighty-Four written by Dorian Lynskey and published by Doubleday in 2019.

References

Further reading

External links 
 

2019 non-fiction books
Doubleday (publisher) books
Books about books
Nineteen Eighty-Four
English-language books
Picador (imprint) books